Acrocercops symbolopis is a moth of the family Gracillariidae. It is known from India and Thailand.

The larvae feed on Achras sapota and Manilkara zapota. They probably mine the leaves of their host plant.

References

symbolopis
Moths of Asia
Moths described in 1936